Flavio Maspoli (29 January 1950 – 11/12 June 2007) was a Swiss politician and a co-founder of the Lega dei Ticinesi. He was a member of the Swiss National Council (1991–2003).

External links 

Ex-Nationalrat Maspoli gestorben  Tages-Anzeiger Online 12 June 2007
Flavio Maspoli – ein Multitalent , NZZ Online 12 June 2007

Members of the National Council (Switzerland)
1950 births
2007 deaths
Ticino League politicians